The  National Vision Party of Liberia (NATVIPOL) is a political party in Liberia. It fielded candidates in the 11 October 2005 elections.

NATVIPOL candidate George Kiadii won 0.4% of the vote in the presidential poll. The party failed to win any seats in the Senate or House of Representatives.

Political parties in Liberia